Rachel Anne Miner is an American actress. She first came to prominence for her portrayal of Michelle Bauer on the television soap opera Guiding Light (1990–95). She made her film debut in Woody Allen's Alice (1990), and later earned critical acclaim for her leading role in Bully (2001). Her other film credits include The Black Dahlia and Penny Dreadful (both 2006). She is also known for her portrayal of Meg Masters on the television series Supernatural (2005–20).

Personal life
A third-generation actor, Miner is the daughter of director and producer Peter Miner and the granddaughter of director/producer Worthington Miner and actress Frances Fuller. In 1998, she married Home Alone actor Macaulay Culkin, when they were both 18. The couple separated in 2000 and divorced in 2002.

Miner was diagnosed with multiple sclerosis in 2010. Though her diagnosis prompted rumors about her retirement, she continues to act. She has since become an advocate for representation of disabled characters.

Career

Film and television
Miner's television credits include Vickie in Shining Time Station: 'Tis a Gift (1990), Michelle Bauer on Guiding Light (1990–1995), a guest starring role as Laurel in a Sex and the City episode, "Twenty-something Girls vs. Thirty-something Women" and Astrid in NY-LON.

In 2001, she starred in Bully. The plot follows several young adults in South Florida who enact a murder plot against a mutual friend who has emotionally, physically and sexually abused them for years. The film itself was based on the July 15, 1993 murder of Bobby Kent. Bully received mixed reviews from critics and has a "Rotten" rating of 54% on Rotten Tomatoes based on 91 reviews with an average score of 5.7 out of 10. The film holds a score of 45 out of 100 on Metacritic, based on 26 critics indicating 'Mixed or average reviews'. Miner won an award at the Stockholm Film Festival for Best Actress.

In 2005, Miner portrayed a young woman on a journey to discover who she is and why multiple enemies want her dead in the action film Circadian Rhythm. The movie was critically ignored, and was poorly received in its few reviews. One reviewer stated that the film was a "directionless jumble of boring scenes strung together tenuously by a plot that feels like they were making it up as they went along," and that watching the film's allegedly ‘wire-fu’ fight scenes was akin to "being over at a friend's house when they’re getting yelled at by their parents."

She appeared in 12 episodes of the 2007 television series Californication, as Dani California, a reference to a character appearing in several songs by the Red Hot Chili Peppers. In 2008, she appeared in "The Sacrifice", an episode of Fear Itself. That same year she was also cast as the second lead in the psychological thriller The Butterfly Effect 3: Revelations. The movie was filmed in Michigan and concluded filming in October 2008. It debuted at  After Dark Horrorfest III, a horror film festival held in January 2009. The film was released on DVD on March 31, 2009.

From 2009 to 2013, Miner took over the role of Meg Masters, a recurring antagonist and demon in Supernatural. The writers wanted Meg's original actress Nicki Aycox to reprise the role in later seasons, but ultimately cast Miner for storyline purposes. The character was eventually killed off later. Tim Janson of Mania gave Miner's portrayal of Meg a positive review, saying no one played Meg "with such dripping sarcasm as Rachel Miner". He felt she "always adds spice when she appears". Similarly, Diana Steenbergen of IGN 
felt Miner played the role "with vicious flair" and "[conveyed] Meg's brutality well, right from the beginning". As time passed, she noted that the actress "has done well taking over the role". In 2020, Miner returned to Supernatural during the fifteenth season playing the cosmic entity known as the Empty masquerading as Meg to communicate with protagonist Castiel. Miner reappeared later in the season, reprising the role of the Empty once again.

In 2010, Miner starred alongside James Franco in the Grasshopper segment of Love & Distrust. The next year she was cast as Sgt. Hannah in the horror film 51, which began filming in April 2011 in Louisiana. The film was released in limited theaters as part of "After Dark Originals".

Theater
Miner's theater credits include "Jennifer" in Laura Cahill's Naked Faith: The Way at Naked Angels in New York (1994), Margot Frank (replacing original cast member Missy Yager) in The Diary of Anne Frank on Broadway (1997), Rivkele in Donald Margulies's adaptation of Sholem Asch's God of Vengeance at ACT Theatre in Seattle (2000), and Sandy in Rebecca Gilman's Blue Surge at the Goodman Theatre in Chicago (2001) and at The Public Theater in New York (2002).

Charity work 
Since September 2017, Miner has been the executive director of the non-profit organization Random Acts, Inc.

Filmography

Film

Television

Music videos
 Sunday, Sonic Youth (1998)
 Only One, Yellowcard (2005)

References

External links
 
 
 

Actresses from New York City
American child actresses
American film actresses
American soap opera actresses
American stage actresses
American television actresses
Living people
People with multiple sclerosis
20th-century American actresses
21st-century American actresses
Year of birth missing (living people)